Suppressor of G2 allele of SKP1 homolog is a protein that in humans is encoded by the SUGT1 gene.

Function 

This gene is homologous to the yeast gene SGT1, which encodes a protein involved in kinetochore function and required for the G1/S and G2/M transitions. Complementation studies suggest that the human protein has similar functions.

Interactions 

SUGT1 has been shown to interact with S100A6.

References

Further reading